The TNCA Serie H "Parasol" was a Mexican bomber and reconnaissance aircraft manufactured by the Talleres Nacionales de Construcciones Aeronáuticas (TNCA). It was a high-wing monoplane (which was very unusual at the time), which allowed better speed performance. It was one of the first aircraft models made by TNCA and was designed as a "Technology Tester", in order to improve the designs of subsequent models. Its design was very similar to the Morane-Saulnier L, especially the design of the landing gear, mast and the controls of the rudders, however the fuselage structure was made of metal tubes. It was powered by a 60 HP TNCA Aztatl six cylinders air cooled engine, with an Anáhuac propeller.

The aircraft did not have fixed weapons, however side-shot machine guns could be mounted, and bombs could be carried under the fuselage.

One example of the Serie H is preserved at the Mexican Air Force Museum (Museo Militar de Aviacion) in Santa Lucía.

Specifications

References

External links
SEDENA

1910s Mexican military aircraft
Single-engined tractor aircraft
Aircraft manufactured in Mexico
Aircraft first flown in 1916